Wake Up is the first Japanese studio album by South Korean boy band BTS. It was released in Japan on December 24, 2014, through Pony Canyon. The 13-track album includes Japanese versions of the band's Korean singles "No More Dream", "Boy in Luv", and "Danger"—all of which were released in the months prior as physical Japanese singles—and two new, original Japanese songs: "The Stars" and "Wake Up". The album became BTS' highest-charting and best-selling album in Japan at the time, following its debut at number three on the Oricon Albums Chart, and sales of over 28,000 copies.

Editions
Limited Edition Type A (PCCA-4137): The limited edition features, along with the standard track list of the album, a video clip of BTS' first official fan meeting in Japan at the Tokyo Dome City Hall, and a campaign lottery ticket.
Limited Edition Type B (PCCA-4138): The limited edition features, along with the standard track list of the album, a DVD with their Japanese music videos, and a campaign lottery ticket.
Regular Edition (PCCA-4139): The regular edition includes the CD only and a random photo card.

Releases
Three songs from the album were released as singles:

The first and debut single, a Japanese version of the song "No More Dream", was released on June 4, 2014. It peaked at number eight in Oricon's weekly chart, selling more than 34,000 copies. Type A, Type B, and a regular edition of the single was released and also included a Japanese version of "Attack on Bangtan" ("進撃の防弾"), while the regular edition included an additional Japanese version of "Like" ("いいね!").

The second single, a Japanese version of the song "Boy In Luv", was released on July 16, 2014. It peaked at number four in Oricon's weekly chart. It has sold for more than 44,000 copies. Type A, Type B, and a regular edition of the single was released and also included a Japanese version of "N.O" , while the regular edition included an additional Japanese version of "Just One Day".

The third and final single, a Japanese version of the song "Danger", was released on November 19, 2014. It peaked at number five in Oricon's  weekly chart, selling 49,124 copies in its first week. Type A, Type B, and a regular edition of the single was released and also included a Japanese SONPUB remix version of "Attack on Bangtan" ("進撃の防弾"), while the regular edition included an additional Japanese version of "Miss Right".

Promotion

For the promotion of their debut Japanese studio album, BTS embarked on their first Japanese concert tour titled BTS 1st Japan Tour 2015 "Wake Up: Open Your Eyes". They toured Tokyo, Osaka, Nagoya, and Fukuoka from  February 10 to February 19, 2015, attracting more than 25,000 spectators.

Shows

Commercial performance
Wake Up debuted on the daily Oricon Albums Chart, two days prior to its official release on the 24th, at number three with 2,715 copies sold. It peaked at number two the following day with an additional 9,428 copies sold. At the end of its first tracking week, the album debuted at number three—BTS' highest peak in Japan—on the Weekly Albums chart issue dated January 5, 2015, for the period December 22–28 with an accumulated 21,192 copies sold. This also put it at number 19 on the Monthly Albums chart for December. The album spent 13 weeks on the Oricon chart, and went on to sell over 28,000 copies, making it BTS' best-selling album in Japan at the time.

Track listing
Credits adapted from the liner notes of the physical album.

Original

Limited Edition Type A

Limited Edition Type B

Release history

References

External links
 
 
 

2014 albums
BTS albums
Japanese-language albums
Hybe Corporation albums